Prunus prostrata (mountain, rock, creeping, spreading or prostrate  cherry) is a hardy alpine shrub found naturally above about 2000 m. up to as high as 4000 m. in Israel, Algeria, Morocco, Tunisia,  Syria, Turkey, Albania, Greece, Sardinia, Croatia. It grows as tall as 1 m., more typically 0.15-0.30 m., sometimes in the crevices of vertical surfaces. The branches tend to follow the surface at any angle. Flowering patches of the plant on the rocky slopes, sometimes still snow-clad, are striking to climbers.

The bark is reddish brown. The leaves are ovate, with serrate margins, tomentose with white down on undersurface, glabrous above. The petioles lack glands. The flowers are an unusual light rose color, coming out in April–May, solitary or in pairs, nearly sessile, with a tubular calyx. There are 22-24 stamens. The fruit is red, ovate, with thin flesh, ripening in July.

Uses
The fruit is edible but not preferred by humans. The plant's main use is as in ornamental gardening. It can be grafted to form a tree.

Classification
The name Prunus prostrata was assigned by Jacques Labillardière, the French botanist, in Icones plantarum Syriae rariorum, published on his return from a plant-hunting expedition to the Middle East. Prostrata means "lying on the ground", referring to the plant's ground-hugging propensity, a mechanical necessity at high altitude. A prostrate branch bends back to the ground.

Palaeobotanical evidence
A recent study of pollen and other microfossils from a core sample taken in an intermontane valley of the Segura mountains in southern Spain finds P. prostrata in a "Prunus type" located in two radiocarbon-dated zones from about 2630 BP to about 1550 BP and again from about 790 BP to present. The ecology of the Prunus type was "high-altitude open pine forest." The core goes back to 8320 BP, but there is no evidence if Prunus in it before 2630.

References

External links
 
 
 

prostrata
prostrata
Flora of Southeastern Europe
Flora of North Africa
Flora of Western Asia
Taxa named by Jacques Labillardière